

Champions
World Series: New York Giants over Philadelphia Athletics (4-1)

MLB statistical leaders

Major league baseball final standings

American League final standings

National League final standings

Events
April 26 – Chicago Cubs outfielder Jack McCarthy ties a major league record by starting three double plays in one game from the outfield.
June 5 - Catcher Gabby Street is loaned by the Boston Beaneaters to the Cincinnati Reds. he is returned to the Reds on the 15th of June. 
June 13 – Christy Mathewson of the New York Giants tosses his second career no-hitter in a 1–0 victory against the Chicago Cubs.
June 29 – Archibald "Moonlight" Graham made his major league debut with the New York Giants during a game against the host Brooklyn Superbas at Washington Park. For the bottom of the eighth inning, Graham was sent in to play right field, replacing George Browne. In the top of the ninth, Graham was on deck when Claude Elliott flied out for the third and final out. Graham played the bottom of the ninth at right field but never came to bat, as the Giants won 11–1. That game turned out to be his only appearance in the major leagues. His story was popularized in Shoeless Joe, a novel by W. P. Kinsella, and the subsequent 1989 film Field of Dreams.
July 4 – In one of the greatest duels in baseball history, Cy Young and Rube Waddell go toe to toe in Boston. The A's and Waddell win 4–2 in 20 innings. 
July 22 – Weldon Henley of the Philadelphia Athletics pitches a no-hitter in the first game of a doubleheader against the St. Louis Browns. Philadelphia wins, 6–0.
August 9 – Mistaking her husband for a burglar, the mother of minor league outfielder Ty Cobb shoots and kills him, an incident that will be cited as the reason for Cobb's intense desire to succeed. He will make his major league debut with the Tigers later this month.
August 16 - The Chicago Cubs purchase the contract of pitcher Jack Pfiester from the Omaha Rourkes of the Western League.
September 1 - The Chicago White Stockings draft Branch Rickey from the Dallas Giants from the Texas League.
September 6 – Frank Smith of the Chicago White Sox pitches a no-hitter in the second game of a doubleheader against the Detroit Tigers, as the Sox win 15–0.
September 27 – Boston American pitcher Bill Dinneen tosses a no-hitter in a 2–0 victory against the Chicago White Sox.
October 9 – Christy Mathewson of the New York Giants outpitches 26-game-winner Eddie Plank and the Philadelphia Athletics, 3–0, in the first game of an all-shutout World Series.
October 14 – In Game 5 of the World Series, the New York Giants defeat the Philadelphia Athletics, 2–0, to claim their first world championship, four games to one.
October 22 – The Los Angeles Angels of the Pacific Coast League beats the visiting Portland Beavers, 3–2, in 11 innings. Los Angeles pitcher Bill Tozer ends his PCL record of 48 consecutive shutout inning-streak when Portland scored two unearned runs in the third inning.

Births

January
January 2 – Red Kress
January 2 – Pinky Whitney
January 7 – Frank Grube
January 13 – Charlie Wilson
January 17 – Ray Cunningham
January 20 – Ike Danning
January 21 – Larry Boerner
January 24 – Rufus Smith

February
February 5 – Joe Hutcheson
February 6 – Eddie Hunter
February 7 – Cy Moore
February 11 – Ed Walsh Jr.
February 15 – Hal Lee
February 17 – Ed Brandt
February 23 – Les Barnhart
February 24 – Lynn Nelson
February 26 – Emmett Nelson

March
March 1 – Jim Beckman
March 11 – Joe Mellana
March 14 – Jack Rothrock
March 21 – Joe Samuels
March 27 – Johnny Gill
March 28 – Allen Benson

April
April 3 – Gordie Hinkle
April 7 – Joe Hassler
April 9 – Earl Caldwell
April 10 – Ed Strelecki
April 13 – Biff Wysong
April 18 – Mal Moss
April 25 – Belve Bean

May
May 3 – Red Ruffing
May 5 – Jack Ryan
May 7 – Dave Barbee
May 15 – Chet Falk
May 18 – Art Jorgens
May 23 – Harry Child
May 31 – Peaches Davis

June
June 5 – Yoyo Díaz
June 5 – Owen Kahn
June 10 – Vic Harris
June 10 – Danny MacFayden
June 17 – Chink Outen
June 25 – Johnny Pasek
June 30 – Art Scharein

July
July 6 – Ned Porter
July 13 – Tiny Chaplin
July 16 – Lou Garland
July 22 – Doc Cramer
July 24 – Ed Montague
July 26 – Sam Leslie
July 27 – Leo Durocher
July 27 – Rudy Leopold
July 30 – Hal Finney

August
August 5 – Ray Pepper
August 6 – Ed Roetz
August 7 – Jim Cronin
August 10 – Jim Oglesby
August 10 – Willie Wells
August 10 – Ed Wineapple
August 12 – Don Hurst
August 17 – Johnny Watwood
August 21 – Jim Mosolf
August 21 – Frank Waddey
August 23 – Phil Page
August 31 – Frank Pearce
August 31 – Jack White

September
September 2 – Bernie James
September 5 – Bill McGhee
September 5 – Danny Musser
September 8 – Ed Grimes
September 9 – Charlie Perkins
September 10 – Irv Jeffries
September 11 – Glenn Spencer
September 15 – Vance Page
September 15 – Henry Peploski
September 16 – Dinny McNamara
September 16 – Joe Vance
September 17 – Red Parnell
September 22 – Larry Bettencourt
September 25 – Greg Mulleavy
September 26 – Pat Caraway
September 26 – Johnny Hodapp
September 27 – Marty Lang
September 28 – Paul Easterling
September 29 – Bruce Cunningham
September 30 – Luther Harvel

October
October 3 – Johnny Riddle
October 10 – Wally Berger
October 10 – John Stone
October 11 – Joel Hunt
October 12 – Rick Ferrell
October 19 – Mike Meola
October 24 – Jack Russell
October 24 – Charlie Small
October 25 – Joe Malay

November
November 4 – Lefty Willis
November 5 – Carl Fischer
November 13 – Milt Shoffner
November 21 – Freddie Lindstrom
November 21 – Les Mallon
November 26 – Bob Johnson
November 28 – Ed Chapman
November 29 – Harlan Pyle

December
December 1 – Buddy Dear
December 2 – Leon Williams
December 5 – Gus Mancuso
December 9 – Adam Comorosky
December 11 – Al Weston
December 14 – Bob Weiland
December 21 – Fred Koster
December 30 – John Pomorski

Deaths

January–March
January 18 – Fergy Malone, 63, Irish catcher and manager in a career that spanned 14 years from 1871 to 1884.
January 28 – Len Stockwell, 45, outfielder for the Cleveland Blues and Spiders teams.
February 6 – Ned Cuthbert, 59, outfielder who hit .254 with five teams between 1871 and 1884.
February 13 – Bill Eagan, 35, second baseman for three teams from 1891 to 1898.
February 13 – Ralph Ham, 55, outfielder for the 1871 Rockford Forest Citys.
February 18 – Tom Poorman, 47, outfielder for five teams from 1880 to 1888, who led American Association in triples and stolen bases in its 1887 season.
March 3 – Stump Weidman, 44, pitcher for nine seasons from 1880 to 1888, most notably for the Detroit Wolverines.
March 7 – John Murphy, 47, pitcher who posted a 5–12 record for the Altoona Mountain City and Wilmington Quicksteps in the 1884 season.
March 15 – Pete Meegan, 42, pitcher for two seasons, 1884 and 1885 with the Richmond Virginians and the Pittsburgh Alleghenys.
March 18 – Dick Higham, 53, English right fielder and catcher who led National League in doubles in its 1876 first season, in runs and doubles in 1878; later an umpire, barred from the sport in 1882.
March 22 – Gus Krock, 38, pitched from 1888 to 1890 for the Cubs, Hoosiers, Nationals and Bisons.

April–June
April 24 – Jim Gardner, 30, pitcher and infielder for the Pittsburgh Pirates/Orphans from 1895 to 1902.
April 25 – Jackie Hayes, 43, catcher/outfielder for seven different teams from 1882 to 1990.
May 7 – Al Mays, 39, pitcher who went 53–90 with a 3.91 ERA for the Colonels/Metropolitans/Bridegrooms/Solons from 1885 to 1890.
May 13 – Sam Gillen, 38, infielder for the 1893 Pittsburgh Pirates and the 1897 Philadelphia Phillies.
May 17 – John Abadie, 50, first baseman who batted a combined .224 with the Philadelphia Centennials and the Brooklyn Atlantics in 1875.
May 22 – Ed Kennedy, 49, outfielder who played from 1883 through 1886 for the New York Metropolitans and Brooklyn Grays.
May 22 – George Zettlein, 60, pitcher who won 125 games in the National Association and ended Cincinnati's 84-game winning streak in 1870.
May 24 – Bill Goodenough, 41, outfielder for the 1893 St. Louis Browns.
May 25 – Paul Cook, 42, catcher who played from 1884 to 1891 for the Quakers, Colonels, Ward's Wonders and Browns.
June 1 – Harry East, 43, third baseman for the 1882 Baltimore Orioles.
June 30 – Pete Dowling, 28, pitcher who posted a 39–65 record with the Colonels, Brewers and Blues from 1897 to 1901.

July–September
July 28 – Jim Tray, 45, catcher for the 1884 Indianapolis Hoosiers.
July 28 – Harry Von der Horst, 54, former owner of the Baltimore Orioles and Brooklyn Superbas.
August 2 – George Snyder, 57, pitched briefly for the 1882 Philadelphia Athletics.
August 27 – Heinie Kappel, 41, infielder who hit a combined .269 for the Cincinnati Red Stockings (1887-88) and Columbus Solons (1899).
September 10 – Pete Browning, 44, legendary outfielder who helped to create the Louisville Slugger baseball bat and hit a .341 lifetime for the second-highest mark among right-handed hitters, who also won three batting titles and hit for the cycle twice, in a career that spanned from 1882 to 1894.
September 11 – Jerry McCormick, 43, third baseman who played from 1893 to 1984 with three different teams in the American Association and the Union Association.
September 12 – Billy Taylor, 34, infielder who hit .250 in nine games for the 1898 Louisville Colonels.

October–December
October 8 – Bill Sullivan, 36, pitcher/outfielder who posted a 1–4 record and hit .091 for the 1890 Syracuse Stars.
October 17 – Joe Otten, 35, Dutch outfielder and catcher who hit .241 in 26 games for the 1895 St. Louis Browns.
November 14 – John Connor, 44, pitcher for three teams from 1884 to 1885.
November 23 – Bill Hanlon, 29, first base who played for the 1903 Chicago Cubs.
December 6 – Jack Leary, 48, outfielder, infielder, and pitcher for five seasons from 1880 to 1884.
December 31 – Frank Bonner, 36, infielder who played from 1894 through 1903.